Events from the year 1496 in Ireland.

Incumbent
Lord: Henry VII

Events
Garret More, the Great Earl of Kildare, returns to Ireland as Lord Deputy of Ireland. He holds the position until his death in 1513.
St. Mel's Cathedral, Ardagh, is severely damaged in fighting and never restored.

Births
James Butler (Bocach), ninth earl of Ormond.

Deaths
Rowland Fitz Eustace, 1st Baron Portlester.

References

 
1490s in Ireland
Ireland
Years of the 15th century in Ireland